Pasmaditta is a genus of small air-breathing land snails, terrestrial pulmonate gastropod mollusks in the family Punctidae, the dot snails.

Species
Species within the genus Pasmaditta include:
 Pasmaditta jungermanniae

References

 
Taxonomy articles created by Polbot
Gastropod genera